Garcinia cowa, commonly known as cowa fruit or cowa mangosteen is an evergreen plant with edible fruit native to Asia, India, Bangladesh, Myanmar, Malaysia, Vietnam, Laos, Cambodia, and southwest China. The tree is harvested from the wild for its edible fruits and leaves, which are used locally. Flowers are yellow, male & female flowers are separated.

It is locally known as Kau Thekera (কাও থেকেৰা) in Assamese, Kowa in Bengali and Malayalam, Kau in Manipuri.

Uses

Folk medicine
In Thailand Garcinia cowa has been used in the local folk medicine, the bark as an antipyretic and antimicrobial, the latex as an antipuretic, and the fruits and leaves to improve blood circulation, as an expectorant for coughs and indigestion, and a laxative. The roots are believed to relieve fevers, and in East India, sun-dried slices of the fruit have been used as a treatment for dysentery.

Anti-malarial
Studies have found that the bark contains five xanthones with anti-malarial properties in vitro against Plasmodium falciparum.

Dyes and resins
The bark is also used to produce a yellow dye for clothes. The gum resin is used in varnishes.

See also
 Mangosteen
 Garcinia pedunculata
 Garcinia xanthochymus
 Garcinia lanceifolia
 Garcinia morella
 Garcinia assamica
 Garcinia dulcis

References

Edible fruits
Fruits originating in Asia
cowa
Tropical fruit
Crops
Fruit trees
Plant dyes